The 2023 Pro Bowl Games (branded as the 2023 Pro Bowl Games presented by Verizon for sponsorship reasons) was the National Football League's all-star game for the 2022 NFL season. For the first time, the event consisted of skills competitions and non-contact flag football games, rather than an actual tackle football game. It was held at Allegiant Stadium in Paradise, Nevada, the Intermountain Healthcare Performance Center in Henderson, Nevada, and Bear's Best Golf Course in Las Vegas, Nevada on February 2 and 5, 2023. Voting began on November 15, 2022, and the rosters were announced on December 21, 2022.

Background
The NFL announced on August 9, 2022, that Allegiant Stadium in Paradise, Nevada, will host the Pro Bowl for the second consecutive season.

On September 26, 2022, the league announced they would be replacing the traditional Pro Bowl game with skills competitions throughout the week, culminating with a non-contact flag football game at the end of the week. The NFL has partnered with Peyton Manning and his Omaha Productions to revamp the events. A. Smith & Co. produced the skills competition. On December 5, 2022, it was announced that the coaches for the Pro Bowl would be Peyton and his brother Eli Manning.

Format
The event consisted of various skill competition events and three 7-on-7 flag football games, with the first block of events being held on February 2, 2023 at the Intermountain Healthcare Performance Center, which is the Las Vegas Raiders' practice facility and Bear's Best Golf Course in Las Vegas, Nevada. On February 5, the remainder of the event program took place at Allegiant Stadium with the exception of Kick Tac Toe which was held at the Intermountain Healthcare Performance Center. The first portion took place behind closed doors, while the last contests took place around the flag football games.

Points were scored across the events, with up to 24 points available in the skills competitions. The first two flag football games awarded six points each to the winning conference's total score (with the conferences splitting three points each in the event of a tie, with no overtime being played). Both teams' total scores were carried into the final game, which decided the overall winner.

Rosters

AFC

bold player who participated in the game
 signifies the player has been selected as a captain
 Replacement player selection due to injury or vacancy
 Injured player; selected but did not participate
 Selected but did not play because his team advanced to Super Bowl LVII (See Pro Bowl "Player Selection" section)
 Selected but chose not to participate

NFC

Bold, player who participated in the game
 signifies the player has been selected as a captain
 Replacement player selection due to injury or vacancy
 Injured player; selected but did not participate
 Selected but did not play because his team advanced to Super Bowl LVII (See Pro Bowl "Player Selection" section)
 Selected but chose not to participate

Number of selections per team

Results

Thursday

Precision Passing
Derek Carr won the event for the AFC with a score of 31.

AFC 3 – NFC 0

Lightning Round
The AFC won the event after dunking NFC head coach Eli Manning in confetti in the final round.

AFC 6 – NFC 0

Longest Drive
The event was shown as pre-recorded segment and was held at Bear's Best Golf Course in Las Vegas, Nevada.

Jordan Poyer won the event for the AFC by having the longest drive with a drive of 320 yards (292.608 meters).

AFC 9 – NFC 0

Dodgeball
The NFC won the event after the NFC offense team defeated the AFC defense team in the final round.

AFC 9 – NFC 3

Sunday

Flag Football Game 1
The NFC won the first flag football game by a score of 33 – 27.

TIED 9 – 9

Kick Tac Toe
The event was shown as pre-recorded segment and was held at Intermountain Healthcare center from Thursday's events.

The AFC won the event after being the first team to get three in a row.

AFC 12 – NFC 9

Gridiron Gauntlet
The NFC won the event after Eli Manning crossed the finish line first.

TIED 12 – 12

Flag Football Game 2
The AFC won the second flag football game by a score of 18–13.

AFC 18 – NFC 12

Move The Chains
The AFC won the event after taking the first and third rounds.

AFC 21 – NFC 12

Best Catch
Amon-Ra St. Brown outscored Stefon Diggs by a score of 177.0–145.4 (St. Brown outscored Diggs 85.0–74.7 in round 1 and 92.0–70.7 in round 2), winning the event for the NFC.

Diggs and St. Brown were selected as finalists in a fan vote over Justin Jefferson and Patrick Surtain II retrospectively. Each were shown doing special catches in pre-recorded segments during Thursday's events before the fan vote began.

AFC 21 – NFC 15

Flag Football Game 3
The NFC was down 21–15 entering the game based on the opening scores, but Kirk Cousins led the NFC to a comeback win. The final score was 35–33.

Aftermath
The players who participated on the winning NFC each won $84,000 while the players who participated on the losing AFC team won $42,000 each.

Following the event it was revealed that Myles Garrett suffered a dislocated toe during the Gridiron Gauntlet event.

Broadcasting
ESPN and ABC served as the broadcaster for all Pro Bowl events while the Thursday block of the skills competition were held on the Saturday afternoon after the event on ABC. As in previous years, the events held on Sunday were simulcast live by ESPN+, ABC, and Disney XD. Kirk Herbstreit and Pat McAfee called the games. Robert Griffin III, Marcus Spears, and Laura Rutledge called the skills competition, joined additionally on the first night by Ryan Clark and Dan Orlovsky.

References

External links

2023
2022 National Football League season
2023 in American football
Pro Bowl